Overnights is Australian overnight radio program hosted by Trevor Chappell and Rod Quinn. Chappell hosts the show from ABC Radio Melbourne from Monday to Thursday and Quinn hosts the show from ABC Radio Sydney from Friday to Sunday.

The program usually consists of a mix of news and current affairs, lifestyle, arts, education, music, youth and entertainment. Each night there are regular features and presenters. The listening audience is heavily featured throughout the program.

Overnights is broadcast from 2:00 am to 6:00 am (local time) on ABC Local Radio across Australia, and follows Nightlife. The program is broadcast on delay to South Australia and the Northern Territory as well as simulcast on ABC Digital Radio.

Previous presenters of Overnights include Madeleine Randall (2002-2004), Ingrid Just (2005), Helen Razer (2005) and Zoe Carides (2005).

Fill-in presenters include David Prior, Lisa Hensley, Michael Pavlich, Melanie Tait and Annette Shun Wah.

Regular contributors
Erin Free (film and video reviews)
Martin George (astronomy)
Scott Goodings (TV reviews)
Sabrina Hahn (gardening)
Gisela Kaplan (birds) 
Gordon Lynch (health and fitness)
Janet McLeod (trivia)
Rob Pemberton (DVD reviews)
Chris Frame (cruising)

References

External links
Overnights

Australian Broadcasting Corporation radio programs